Antique vehicle registration is a special form of motor vehicle registration for vehicles that are considered antique, classic, vintage, or historic.  Both the specific term used and the definition of a qualifying vehicle vary from country to country, as well as within a country if it is a federation.

Typically, an antique vehicle is defined by its age at the time at which antique vehicle registration is sought.  As examples, this age is 20 years in the U.S. state of Connecticut, 25 years in the U.S. state of Virginia, 30 years in the Australian state of Queensland, 30 years in Sweden and Brazil, and 35 years in Singapore.  The United Kingdom requires that the vehicle was built before January 1, 1973 although the assumption is made that a vehicle first registered before  January 7, 1973 was actually manufactured in 1972 and is therefore exempt from tax.

Antique vehicle registration may provide certain benefits, such as a reduced or waived registration fee, exemption from vehicle inspection, and/or distinctive vehicle registration plates. However, the owner's privilege of driving the vehicle may be significantly curtailed. For example, in Virginia, the use of a car registered as an antique is limited to participation in car club activities, parades, and the like, driving to and from such events, testing, obtaining maintenance and repairs, and occasional pleasure driving within  of one's residence.  Commuting to and from work is specifically forbidden in Virginia. While having similar rules to the Virginia example above, Tennessee does not allow transfer of antique license plates between owners when a vehicle is sold so the original owner must surrender the antique plate and the new owner must apply for a new one. As of 2009, Tennessee allows transfer of an existing antique tag from a sold vehicle by the selling owner to another antique vehicle owned by the same owner. Operation of a vehicle registered under Tennessee's Antique program requires the vehicle owner to sign an affidavit upon registration certifying their understanding of the Antique Motor Vehicle law, which prescribes that the car is owned strictly as a collector's item, and in exchange for permanent registration of the unmodified antique vehicle that the vehicle is to be used only for parades, tours, testing and servicing, and club events, and is prohibited from serving as general transportation for the owner on any day other than Saturday or Sunday. In Tennessee, upon sale of the antique vehicle, the special Antique Auto plate is to be surrendered to the office of the owner's county clerk. Connecticut has no driving or registration restrictions on autos so registered. In Sweden there are no specific limits and the requirement for a yearly vehicle inspection is reduced to a bi-annual.

The special license plate may take the form of a newly manufactured license plate with a legend such as "Antique", "Historic", "Early American", or "Horseless Carriage."  The license plate may have a separate number sequence from ordinary license plates and may have a distinctive color scheme (for example, in Brazil, plates do have a reversed color scheme: normal plates are black on gray and antique plates are gray on black).  Virginia has two series of such plates, one of which is designed to look old.  Alternatively, under certain circumstances, the special license plate may be an authentic license plate from the same year as the model year of the car (called various terms such as "Year of Manufacture" or "Vintage," depending on the jurisdiction).  Virginia allows the use of such plates if they are embossed (not stickered) with the appropriate year. Tennessee allows the use of antique model year license plates for antique cars provided the car is specially registered as an antique vehicle and the state issued antique tag and registration are kept inside the vehicle for inspection upon demand by law enforcement personnel. As of 2009 Tennessee allows the registration of an antique vehicle with age appropriate antique tag(s)(either one or two plates depending on vehicle production year) within certain guidelines and with use restrictions as above. While the YOM law allows vehicle owners to display the vehicles as they were when first produced, it may not be legal for road use in other states.

References

External links

Antique motor vehicles and trailers, from the Virginia Department of Motor Vehicles

Vehicle registration plates

de:Kfz-Kennzeichen (Deutschland)#Kennzeichen historischer Fahrzeuge